Tomás Gloria Requena (born 7 March 1971) is a Mexican politician from the Institutional Revolutionary Party. From 2006 to 2009 he served as Deputy of the LX Legislature of the Mexican Congress representing Tamaulipas.

References

1971 births
Living people
People from Aguascalientes City
Institutional Revolutionary Party politicians
21st-century Mexican politicians
Deputies of the LX Legislature of Mexico
Members of the Chamber of Deputies (Mexico) for Tamaulipas